Karl Brunner (12 August 1905 – 13 November 1951) was a German politician of the Social Democratic Party (SPD) and former member of the German Bundestag.

Life 
In the first federal election in 1949, he was elected to parliament via the North Rhine-Westphalia state list, to which he belonged until his early death in 1951.

Literature

References

1905 births
1951 deaths
Members of the Bundestag for North Rhine-Westphalia
Members of the Bundestag 1949–1953
Members of the Bundestag for the Social Democratic Party of Germany